McCandless may refer to:

People
McCandless (surname)

Places
McCandless, Pennsylvania, US, a township of 29,000 people
McCandless Archeological Site, near Elkton, Maryland, US

Other uses
The McCandless method for stage lighting, authored by Stanley McCandless
USS McCandless (FF-1084), a US Navy frigate named for Byron McCandless and Bruce McCandless I
McCandless Lunar Lander, named for Bruce McCandless II

See also
 McCandlish, a less common form of the name
 McCanles Gang (sometimes also rendered McCandless), an alleged outlaw gang in the American West of the early 1860s
 "Mac" McCandless, antagonist (played by Anthony Hopkins) in the film Freejack
 McCandles, protagonist family in the 1971 western film Big Jake
 McCanles, protagonist family in the 1946 western film Duel in the Sun and the Niven Busch novel on which it was based